Aksakov is a crater on Mercury. It has a diameter of 174 kilometers. Its name was adopted by the International Astronomical Union (IAU) on April 24, 2012. Aksakov is named for the Russian author Sergey Aksakov, who lived from 1791 to 1859 C.E.

Aksakov is one of 110 peak ring basins on Mercury.

Hollows
Hollows are present along parts of the peak ring and within the unnamed 30-km crater in the interior.

References

Impact craters on Mercury